Kuba is a rural locality (a selo) and the administrative centre of Kubinsky Selsoviet, Laksky District, Republic of Dagestan, Russia. The population was 458 as of 2010. There are 3 streets.

Geography 
Kuba is located 22 km north of Kumukh (the district's administrative centre) by road. Tsudakhar and Karekadani are the nearest rural localities.

Nationalities 
Laks live there.

References 

Rural localities in Laksky District